Euxoa cinchonina is a moth of the family Noctuidae. It is found in Ethiopia.

External links

Endemic fauna of Ethiopia
Euxoa
Insects of Ethiopia
Moths of Africa
Moths described in 1852